Gabriel Viglianti (born June 12, 1979) is an Argentine retired football player.

Career

Viglianti started his career in 2000 with Racing de Córdoba.

In 2004, the player moved to Bolivia where he has played for Unión Central, San José and Bolívar.

The Argentinian was regarded as one of the best midfielders of Liga de Fútbol Profesional Boliviano. The solid performances brought him a transfer to Europe, where he enjoyed a spell of nearly 5 years in Romania in Liga I.

In the middle of the 2007-2008 Liga I season he arrived at Oțelul Galați where he appeared in 15 games and scored 3 goals. In the 2008-2009 season he played in 25 league games and scored 5 goals. In the 2009-2010 season he played in 16 league games and scored 1 goal. In the 2010-2011 season Viglianti played 25 league games and scored 3 goals, helping Oţelul Galaţi win the first title in the history of the club.
In the 2011-2012 season he played in 17 league games without scoring. He also played 3 games in the group stage of UEFA Champions League. He won Supercupa României playing in the 1-0 victory against Steaua București, where he started as a substitute but was introduced in the field by coach Dorinel Munteanu in the 4th minute of the game after the injury of Gabriel Giurgiu.
In the 2012-2013 season Viglianti had his most efficient Liga I season judging by the number of goals scored in the games he played. He appeared in 15 league games and scored 5 goals in the first half of the season, after he decided to retire.

Honours

Club Bolivar
Bolivian First Division: 2006 Clausura

Oțelul Galați
Liga I: 2010–11
Supercupa României: 2011

External links
 
 
 Gabriel Viglianti at BDFA.com.ar 

1979 births
Living people
Footballers from Córdoba, Argentina
Argentine footballers
Expatriate footballers in Romania
Racing de Córdoba footballers
Club San José players
Club Bolívar players
Expatriate footballers in Bolivia
ASC Oțelul Galați players
Liga I players
Argentine expatriate sportspeople in Romania
Argentine expatriate sportspeople in Bolivia
Unión Tarija players
Association football midfielders